John Richard Chuckran (May 7, 1926 – December 1, 1991) was an American football player, coach, professor of physical education, and college athletics administrator.  He served as the athletic director at the University of Rhode Island from 1981 to 1988.

Coaching career
Chuckran was the head football coach at Allegheny College in Meadville, Pennsylvania.  He held that position for 12 seasons, from 1958 until 1969.  His coaching record at Allegheny was 51–37–2.

Death
Chuckran died at the age of 65 on December 1, 1991, at Centre Community Hospital in State College, Pennsylvania.

Head coaching record

College

References

External links
 

1926 births
1991 deaths
Allegheny Gators football coaches
Penn State Nittany Lions football coaches
Penn State Nittany Lions football players
Pennsylvania State University faculty
Rhode Island Rams athletic directors

High school football coaches in Pennsylvania
United States Army personnel of World War II
United States Army soldiers
People from Carbon County, Pennsylvania
Players of American football from Pennsylvania
Deaths from cancer in Pennsylvania